The 1922 NFL season was the third regular season of what was now called the National Football League (NFL); the league changed their name from American Professional Football Association (APFA) on June 24. 

The NFL fielded 18 teams during the season, including new league teams such as the Milwaukee Badgers, the Oorang Indians, the Racine Legion, and the Toledo Maroons. Technically, it was also Green Bay's first full season in the league, after their membership was suspended because the team had fielded college players in 1921. 

The team representatives filed for a new franchise before the 1922 season under the name of the Green Bay Athletic club, and were registered in the league under the name Green Bay Blues. They returned to the original name a year later; most teams around the league continued to call them the Packers. Meanwhile, the Chicago Staleys changed their name to the Chicago Bears, and the Racine Cardinals changed their name to the Chicago Cardinals. 

The Muncie Flyers, Cleveland Indians, Brickley's New York Giants, Cincinnati Celts, Tonawanda Kardex, Washington Senators, and Detroit Tigers dropped out of the league. A 19th team, the Youngstown Patricians, was scheduled to join the league, and had its schedule laid out, but folded before playing in the league. A 20th, the Philadelphia Union Quakers, also was set to join (but presumably not as far along as the Youngstown plans), but did not, due partly to the fact that the Quakers were merely a front for the existing Buffalo All-Americans to play extra games on Saturday. After a four-year hiatus, the Quakers instead joined the American Football League (1926).

The Canton Bulldogs were named the 1922 NFL Champions after ending the season with a 10–0–2 record.

Teams
Eighteen teams competed in the NFL during the 1922 season, down from 21 clubs during the previous season.

Standings

References

 NFL Record and Fact Book
 NFL History 1921–1930 (Last accessed December 4, 2005)
 Total Football: The Official Encyclopedia of the National Football League

1922